Sub Rosa is a ghost town in Franklin County, Arkansas, United States.

History
Sub Rosa was considered a lively trading center in the 1880s with five businesses and seven dwelling houses. A post office called Sub Rosa was in operation from 1853 until 1911.

References

Ghost towns in Arkansas
Geography of Franklin County, Arkansas